The causes of homelessness in Iraq are diverse. Forced evictions of internally displaced persons from public land and buildings have contributed heavily to the homeless population of the country.  In 2007, the United Nations estimated that 16% of the Iraqi population have fled their homes because of the conflict, and half of these have left the country, leaving some of the remaining in the country homeless, though some rent housing or stay with family and friends.

References

Demographics of Iraq
Iraq
Social issues in Iraq